Yamato nadeshiko ( or ) is a Japanese term meaning the "personification of an idealized Japanese woman", or "the epitome of pure, feminine beauty"; poised, decorous, kind, gentle, graceful, humble, patient, virtuous, respectful, benevolent, honest, charitable, faithful.  It is a floral metaphor, combining the words Yamato, an ancient name for Japan, and nadeshiko, a delicate frilled pink carnation called Dianthus superbus, whose kanji translate into English as "caressable child".

The term "Yamato nadeshiko" is often used to describe a demure young woman and, in a contemporary context, nostalgically of women with good traits which are perceived as being increasingly rare. 

The official nickname of the Japan women's national football team is Nadeshiko Japan which was derived from Yamato nadeshiko. The nickname was chosen by contest in 2004.

See also 
 Cult of Domesticity
 English rose (epithet)
 Eternal feminine
 Gentlewoman
 Good Wife, Wise Mother
 Ideal womanhood
 María Clara
 Marianismo
 Seven Heavenly Virtues
 Yamato-damashii
 Rainbow Mika, who has a wrestling partner called Yamato Nadeshiko

References

External links and references
 sci.lang.japan FAQ: What is Yamato Nadeshiko

Female stock characters in anime and manga
Japanese aesthetics
Japanese values
Japanese words and phrases
Personifications
Women in Japan